Marta Lainfiesta Dorión (January 10, 1886 – May 8, 1976) was a Guatemalan woman who was the wife of Guatemalan President and dictator Jorge Ubico Castañeda.

She was born in Guatemala City, daughter of Victor Lainfiesta Torres and María Josefa Amalia Dorion Klée. Subsequently, she married on March 15, 1905, with General Jorge Ubico Castañeda.

During her husband's political career, she maintained a low profile and even after Ubico assumed the presidency in 1931. Lainfiesta accompanied Ubico only on national and international trips as well as brief appearances at official events and visits by foreign leaders. After the resignation of Ubico, Lainfiesta accompanied him to the United States, Ubico died in 1946. Subsequently, the remains of Ubico were repatriated and she moved to Guatemala, where she died in 1976.

References

1885 births
1976 deaths
First ladies of Guatemala